Feilding Aerodrome (ICAO: NZFI) is a small airport located three nautical miles (5.6 km) southeast of Feilding, a town in the Manawatu District in the North Island of New Zealand.

Operational Information 
Runway Strength -  ESWL 1020
Pilot Activated Lighting available
Circuit:
Runway 10 – Left Hand
Runways 28 – Right Hand
Circuit Altitude 1100 ft AMSL
Standard Overhead Rejoin Altitude 1500 ft AMSL

Gliders from the Wanganui Manawatu Gliding Club operate at the field.

Sources 

NZAIP Volume 4 AD
New Zealand AIP (PDF)

Airports in New Zealand
Aerodrome
Transport in Manawatū-Whanganui
Transport buildings and structures in Manawatū-Whanganui